Freddie Foxxx Is Here is the debut studio album by American East Coast hip hop artist Freddie Foxxx. It was released in 1989 via MCA Records, and is produced by Foxxx himself as well as Eric B. of Eric B. & Rakim.

Track listing

Sample credits
 Track 1 contains elements from "Give It Up or Turnit a Loose (Remix)" by James Brown (1986)
 Track 3 contains elements from "Escape-Ism" by James Brown (1971)
 Track 5 contains elements from "Apache" by Incredible Bongo Band (1973), "Change the Beat (Female Version)" by Beside (1982), and "Raptivity" by Ronnie Gee (1980)
 Track 8 contains elements from "Breakin' Bread" by Fred & the New J.B.'s (1974) and "La Di Da Di" by Doug E. Fresh & Slick Rick (1985)
 Track 9 contains elements from "UFO" by ESG (1981)
 Track 10 contains elements from "Funky Sensation" by Gwen McCrae (1981)
 Track 11 contains elements from "Funky Drummer" by James Brown (1970) and "Change the Beat (Female Version)" by Beside (1982)
 Track 12 contains elements from "I'm Gonna Love You Just a Little More Baby" by Barry White (1973) and "You Gotta Come Out Fresh" by Supreme Force (1986)

Personnel
James F. Campbell – main artist, producer, songwriter (tracks: 1-6, 8-12)
Louis Eric Barrier – producer
DJ Kut Terrorist – scratches
"Lazer" Mike Rhodes – engineering
D'Anthony Johnson – engineering
Patrick Peter Owen Adams – recording
Elai Shuma Lii Tubo – recording
Carlton S. Batts – mastering
Glen E. Friedman – design & photography
Cey Adams – artwork

References

External links

1989 debut albums
Freddie Foxxx albums
Albums produced by Eric B.